Krnjača Bridge railway station is a railway stop serving the outskirts of Krnjača settlement in Palilula municipality of Belgrade, Serbia.

Opened in 2016, the stop has two tracks with a single island platform. It is served by BG Voz and by Srbija Voz line 52 connecting Pančevo Vojlovica to Pančevački Most. The stop's name (literally: Krnjača–bridge) comes from its proximity to Pančevo Bridge.

The stop is connected with the Belgrade public transit bus line 108. In the vicinity there is also a bus stop with several other public transit lines.

References 

Railway stations in Belgrade
Palilula, Belgrade